Jamshidabad-e Heydar (also Romanized as Jamshīdābād-e Ḩeydar; also known as Jamshīdābād and Ḩamīdābād) is a village in Zagheh Rural District, Zagheh District, Khorramabad County, Lorestan Province, Iran. At the 2006 census, its population was 44, in 10 families.

References 

Towns and villages in Khorramabad County